The Roosevelt Elementary School District is a public school district located in the Phoenix, Arizona area. It has 19 schools.

The Roosevelt School District #66 was established in Phoenix, Arizona in 1912. The first Roosevelt School District School was located south of the Phoenix City Center on the corner of what is now 7th Street and Southern.

Schools
 T. G. Barr School
 Bernard Black Elementary School
 Maxine O. Bush Elementary School
 Cloves C. Campbell Sr. Elementary School
 Cesar E. Chavez Community School
 Ignacio G. Conchos School
 John R. Davis School
 Curtis O. Greenfield School
 Amy L. Houston Academy
 C. J. Jorgensen School
 Percy L. Julian School
 John F. Kennedy School
 Martin Luther King Early Child Education Center
 V. H. Lassen Elementary School
 Rose Linda School
 Ed and Verma Pastor Elementary School
 Sierra Vista Elementary School
 Southwest School
 Sunland Elementary School
 Valley View Elementary School
 George Benjamin Brooks Academy

References

External links
 

School districts in Phoenix, Arizona
School districts established in 1912
School districts in Maricopa County, Arizona
1912 establishments in Arizona